Sam Battle, known online as Look Mum No Computer is a YouTuber, electronics enthusiast, musician and composer who posts videos about making pro audio gear and synthesizers, as well as original music tracks. He is known for esoteric and eccentric musical devices made from vintage technology, such as a Furby organ, a synthesizer fused with a classic Raleigh Chopper bicycle and a Gameboy Triple Oscillator. Battle directs This Museum is Not Obsolete, a museum in Ramsgate, Kent which showcases vintage analogue devices, often repurposed for humorous uses.

Youtube 
Sam Battle launched his Youtube channel in 2013, originally setup for ZIBRA, a band that Battle created with three friends. Battle's first music gear related video was posted in 2016. Besides ad income from Youtube, Battle has also been funding his electronic inventions with fan donations, on the subscription platform Patreon.

In 2019, he created a Furby (an electronic robotic toy) based synthesizer, by wiring it up into a modular synthesizers. In 2022, Battle began restoring a 1914 church organ, as an exhibit in This Museum is Not Obsolete, the process of which has been documented on his channel. Battle also produces and sells modular synthesizer components, such as the #1222 Performance VCO.

As of November 2022, his Youtube channel has garnered over fifty five million views.

Music career 
He released his first single called "Groundhog Day" in 2019. He did a tour in Germany, Switzerland and the UK in 2019.

In May 2022, he joined with Cuckoo and Hainbach to form a musical supergroup.

Battle has co-produced several composition for screening, such as Satellite Moment  (with Charlie Fink), for the film adaptation of a Street Cat Named Bob, as well as Glitter and Gold (with Barns Courtney) for Netflix's series Safe.

Discography

As Look Mum No Computer

Singles 

 "Groundhog Day" – 2019
 "Modern Gas" – 2019
 "Shock Horror" – 2020
 "Desperado Vespa" – 2020
 "Daydreamer" – 2020
 "Stand and Deliver" – 2020
 "Youth8500" – 2021
 "Stupid Me" – 2021
 "RIDE" – 2021
 "Mind Over Matter" – 2021
 "We'll Find a Way" – 2022

Albums and EPs 

 "Human Procrastination" – 2019 (EP)
 "These Songs are Obsolete" – 2020
 "Look Mum No Bootleg PT. I" – 2022
 "Look Mum No Bootleg PT. II" – 2022

External links 

 LOOK MUM NO COMPUTER – Youtube Channel

References 

21st-century male artists
Living people
Music YouTubers
YouTube vloggers
Electronic musicians
British male composers
1989 births